The St. Ignatius Mission is a landmark Catholic mission located in St. Ignatius, Montana. It was founded in 1854 by Jesuit priests Pierre-Jean De Smet and Adrian Hoecken. The current mission church was built between 1891 and 1893, and listed on the National Register of Historic Places in 1973.

The mission church serves the St. Ignatius parish within the Missoula Deanery of the Roman Catholic Diocese of Helena.

Architecture
The mission church is a simplified, vernacular example of Gothic revival architecture constructed of bricks made from native clay. The most exceptional feature of the interior are the 58 murals painted by Brother Joseph Carignano, an untrained artist who worked as a cook in the mission. The murals include depictions of Christian imagery mixed with representations of the Salish belief system.

Notes and references

External links 

  History and visiting information
Mission website

1854 establishments in the United States
History museums in Montana
Museums in Lake County, Montana
Churches on the National Register of Historic Places in Montana
Roman Catholic churches completed in 1893
Religious museums in the United States
Religious organizations established in 1854
Roman Catholic churches in Montana
National Register of Historic Places in Lake County, Montana
19th-century Roman Catholic church buildings in the United States
Gothic Revival architecture in Montana